This is a list of human spaceflights to the Tiangong space station.

Past

Ongoing

Future

References 

Tiangong